The Young Diana is a lost 1922 American silent drama film directed by Albert Capellani and Robert G. Vignola and written by Luther Reed. The film stars Marion Davies, Macklyn Arbuckle, Forrest Stanley, Gypsy O'Brien, and Pedro de Cordoba. It is based on the 1918 novel The Young Diana by Marie Corelli. The film was released on August 27, 1922, by Paramount Pictures.

Cast 
Marion Davies as Diana May
Macklyn Arbuckle as James P. May
Forrest Stanley as Commander Cleeve
Gypsy O'Brien as Lady Anne
Pedro de Cordoba as Dr. Dimitrius

Production 
In her 14th film, Marion Davies plays the young Diana May. The film required Davies to play a faded, aged woman and also employs a science fiction theme of rejuvenation. This was a troubled production. Albert Capellani began production in April 1921, but he was replaced by Robert G. Vignola (who may have re-shot all of Capellani's footage), and the film was finally released in August 1922. Forrest Stanley co-stars with Davies for the third time.

References

External links 

 

1922 films
1920s English-language films
Silent American drama films
1922 drama films
Paramount Pictures films
Films based on British novels
Films based on works by Marie Corelli
Films directed by Albert Capellani
Films directed by Robert G. Vignola
American black-and-white films
Lost American films
American silent feature films
1922 lost films
Lost drama films
1920s American films